was a Japanese physician who survived the Hiroshima bombing in 1945 and kept a diary of his experience. He was Director of the Hiroshima Communications Hospital and lived near the hospital, about a mile from the explosion's center. A 1984 editorial in the Journal of the American Medical Association, indicates "At the urging of friends, Dr. Hachiya first published his diary in a small Japanese-language medical journal (Teishin Igaku) that circulated among medical members of the Japanese communications services. There it came to the attention of Warner Wells, MD, an American physician who was working in Japan in 1950 as a surgical consultant to the Atomic Bomb Casualty Commission."  It was Dr. Wells, who in consultation with Dr. Hachiya, made the diary to be published in 1955, under the name of Hiroshima Diary.

During, and post bombing life

Hachiya's diary cover the period from Aug. 6, 1945 to Sept. 30, 1945. He described the effects of the atomic bomb blast from its first flash in the early morning as he rested from his night shift as an air warden at the hospital. The force of the blast stripped all the clothes from his body but he and his wife survived, however they both received serious burns to their bodies and had to journey to the hospital Michihiko worked at. When Michihiko returned to the hospital that he worked in, the Hiroshima Communications Hospital, he spent the night in the care of the hospital staff who were not seriously injured. After his injuries healed, Michihiko started making his daily rounds that he would have normally made as a doctor. The staff and patients at the hospital call the atomic bomb that hit their city "pikadon". Pika describes a flash of light and don describes an explosive sound. As time passes an understanding of what hit their city clears up, and historical events such as the surrender of Japan are brought up. The condition of the hospital also drastically improves as more medical supplies are brought into the city, allowing them to better treat patients. After the bombing he wrote the book The Hiroshima Diary. This book describes what happened to him and what he saw.

References 
 Michihiko Hachiya, Hiroshima Diary (Chapel Hill: University of North Carolina, 1955), translated and edited by Warner Wells, MD, 
 editorial: The Shadow of Hiroshima: Two diaries. Journal of the American Medical Association, 1984 Aug. 3; 252(5): 667-668.

Hibakusha
People from Okayama Prefecture
Japanese diarists
1903 births
1980 deaths
20th-century diarists